List of Scottish Rugby Union Presidents is a list of people who have held the position of President of the Scottish Rugby Union and its predecessor the Scottish Football Union.

There is a discrepancy on the current official list over SRU Presidents over the World War periods.

Tom Scott was President before and after the First World War. The official list states he was President for the 1914-15 season and 1919-20 season. Other sources have Scott the President throughout the First World War.

In an omission, Patrick Munro is currently excluded from the official list of Presidents altogether. Newspaper reports of the time state he was President. In addition, the Forsyth's Rugby Record state that Munro was President from 1939-1942; and that Harry Smith took over as Acting President from 1942.

In this list we have taken Scott to be President throughout the First World War, added Patrick Munro and given Harry Smith the position from 1942, following the clarity of Forsyth's Rugby Record of the time.

References

Lists of Scottish sportspeople
Scottish Rugby Union